Brandon Truaxe (born Ali Roshan; 19 June 1978 – 20 January 2019), was an Iranian-Canadian computer scientist and cosmetics entrepreneur known as the co-founder of DECIEM, the Toronto-based beauty company.

Early life 
Truaxe was born Ali Roshan in Tehran on 19 June 1978. His family moved from Iran to Toronto, Canada, in 1995. After Truaxe's mother died of breast cancer, his father returned to Iran. Truaxe studied computer science at the University of Waterloo, graduating in 2001. After school, he had an internship on analysis software at a cosmetics company in New York. While there, he was surprised at the mark-ups that were charged for the price of the products, versus the real cost to produce the products.

Truaxe founded software development firm, Schematte Corporation, and nutritional supplements company, Organic Senses Ltd. Both companies were dissolved in 2007 and 2008 for failure to file annual returns.

In 2003, Truaxe founded his first skin care brand Euoko with partner Julio Torres, supported by Pasquale Cusano, a Vancouver jeweler, who served as his mentor and investor. Truaxe resigned from the company in 2011.

In 2009 he launched Indeed Labs, which includes the Nanoblur collection. Truaxe later left Indeed Labs to found Deciem in 2012.

DECIEM 
In 2012, Truaxe co-founded DECIEM The Abnormal Beauty Company. DECIEM functioned as an umbrella company for more than 10 other brands. In April 2013, DECIEM debuted its first brand, Inhibitif, followed by The Chemistry Brand, Fountain and Grow Gorgeous. During the period of his non-compete clauses, he created the anti-aging hand cream for The Chemistry Brand. It was an instant bestseller when it launched, partly because people were using it on their faces - Truaxe had "thrown down the gauntlet".

DECIEM's multi-brand strategy was driven by a vertically integrated structure: It had its own laboratory, in-house manufacturing, in-house e-commerce, in-store stores, and proprietary marketing infrastructure.

In August 2016, Truaxe co-launched DECIEM's The Ordinary product line with twenty-seven products, combining cutting-edge science with modest price points. He was realising his mission to "democratise serious skincare". It first sold exclusively online, then in various department stores, and about 30 company-owned stores it opened in Canada, the US, the UK, Mexico, South Korea and the Netherlands.

In June 2017 Truaxe's success attracted the attention of leading beauty conglomerate Estée Lauder Companies (ELC), which acquired an equity ownership of 28% (one-third equal partner) in DECIEM for $50 million. At the time, Truaxe released a statement praising ELC for embracing ″our margins, our pricing strategy, our future plans (and) our disruptiveness″. His decision was driven by the fact that the company simply could not keep up with the consumer demand for their products. In late 2018, DECIEM was in 42 stores worldwide and sold more than one product every second.

Truaxe received, among others awards, the Luxury Briefing Award (ideas and excellence across the luxury industry) in the “Innovation in Beauty” category. All DECIEM products, across all brands including The Ordinary, are free of parabens, sulphates, mineral oil, methylchloroisothiazolinone, methylisothiazolinone, animal oils, coal tar dyes, formaldehyde, mercury and oxybenzone.

Under his leadership, annual revenue was headed to $300 million in sales, with plans to quickly quintuple in size in 2019.

Controversy 
In early 2018, Truaxe was accused of erratic behavior. His employee, Nicola Kilner Reddington stated that "Before 2018, he barely even drank alcohol," responding to reports that he was ingesting psychedelic mushrooms in front of employees, convinced of their creative and spiritual benefits. According to an interview with the Financial Post, Truaxe took crystal meth in Britain, leading to an arrest and treatment.

In October 2018, ELC sought legal action after Truaxe ordered all of Deciem's operations to close with immediate effect due to "financial crimes". He reached out on social media claiming attacks on his reputation via false information and fear for the safety of his family and himself. Truaxe was ousted as CEO, and Nicola Kilner Reddington was appointed as the sole CEO. A few days later, a restraining order was issued against Truaxe after he had sent emails to ELC chair emeritus Leonard Lauder and other executives. Andrew Ross, executive vice president of strategy and new business development at ELC, and Pasquale Cusano, the Vancouver jeweller, were now the company's only board members. ELC's injunction also led to the appointment of Pricewaterhouse Coopers to investigate, and report to the board, the alleged financial crimes.

Death 
Only a few months later, Truaxe died at age 40. His death took place early on morning, 20 January 2019, reportedly after falling from his Toronto apartment in the Distillery District. 

A spokesperson for Estée Lauder Companies stated: "Brandon Truaxe was a true genius, and we are incredibly saddened by the news of his passing. As the visionary behind Deciem, he positively impacted millions of people around the world with his creativity, brilliance and innovation."

References 

1978 births
2019 deaths
Cosmetics businesspeople
Cosmetics people
Canadian retail chief executives
Naturalized citizens of Canada
Canadian computer scientists
Iranian computer scientists
Iranian emigrants to Canada
University of Waterloo alumni
Canadian businesspeople in fashion